Tillandsia bourgaei is a species of flowering plant in the family Bromeliaceae. This species is endemic to South Mexico and central American. This species 

was described and the name validly published by John Gilbert Baker in 1887.

Cultivars
 Tillandsia 'Aristocrat'

References

BSI Cultivar Registry Retrieved 11 October 2009

bourgaei
Flora of Mexico
Taxa named by John Gilbert Baker